Siah Bisheh may refer to:
 Siah Bisheh, Chalus